The 1987–88 Honduran Segunda División was the 21st season of the Honduran Segunda División.  Under the management of Mario Sandoval, C.D. Curacao won the tournament after finishing first in the final round (or Cuadrangular) and obtained promotion to the 1988–89 Honduran Liga Nacional.

Final round
Also known as Cuadrangular.

Standings

Known results

References

Segunda
1987